Swimming was contested at the 1966 Asian Games in Wisutamol Swimming Pool, Bangkok, Thailand from December 13 to December 17, 1966.

Medalists

Men

Women

Medal table

References
 Sports 123: Asian Games

External links
 Fourth Asian Games Bangkok 1966

 
1966 Asian Games events
1966
Asian Games
1966 Asian Games